Une sorte de Justice. Le procès du maire de Férel pendant la Terreur (1981) is a French-language novel by French author René Chatal. The title translates to A kind of Justice. The trial of the mayor of Férel during the Terror

History

The novel tells the story of a miscarriage of justice, during the French Revolution, taking place in a little village called Férel (Morbihan).The mayor, François Chatal, a thirty-three-year-old farmer, was wrongly denounced as an enemy of the revolution.

He was sentenced to death on 31 August 1793 and executed by guillotine in the commune of La Roche-Bernard on 5 September 1793.

Author

René Chatal (1923-1996) was a French lawyer. François Chatal was his great great grandfather.

Original Edition (1981)

Publisher : Jean Le Fur (France)
165 p.
Library of Congress Control Number : 85673172

Bibliography (p.133-137)
 La justice révolutionnaire dans le Morbihan - J.L.Debauve
 Correspondence du Capitaine Perret avec son frère - Robiquet
 Petit mémoire sur la chouannerie de l'An IV - Locperan de Kerviler
 Le Diocèse de Nantes pendant le Révolution - Alfred Laillé

References

See also

 Reign of Terror (La Terreur)

1981 French novels
French historical novels
Novels set in the French Revolution
Novels set in Brittany